Harry Godfrey (born 3 January 2003) is a New Zealand rugby union player, who currently plays as a first five-eighth or fullback for  in New Zealand's domestic National Provincial Championship competition and the  in Super Rugby.

Early career

Godfrey was born and raised in Hunterville in the Manawatū-Whanganui region in the lower half of New Zealand's North Island. He attended Whanganui Collegiate School and played both rugby and cricket for the school. In 2019, he played for the school's 1st XV team that finished second in the Central North Island competition. The following year, he captained the team to a third place in that competition. He also played rugby sevens for his school, including at the 2020  Secondary School Sevens, of which he made the Tournament Team.

Godfrey represented Whanganui at age grade level.

After graduating high school, Godfrey headed to Hawke's Bay where he plays for the Central Hawke's Bay Rugby & Sports Club in the province's club rugby competition.

After good performances for the Hawke's Bay Academy team in 2021, Godfrey was named in the Hurricanes U20 squad for that year's Super Rugby Aotearoa Under-20 tournament.

Senior career

At only 18 years old, Godfrey was named in the  squad for the 2021 Bunnings NPC season. He made his debut for the province on 6 November 2021 in a non-competition game against . He scored his first try for the Magpies the following season, in their Ranfurly Shield defence against  on 30 July 2022. His first NPC game followed on 17 August 2022 against  in Dunedin.

Godfrey was one of a select group of young players, who earned a National Development Contract and trained with the  ahead of, and during, the 2022 Super Rugby Pacific season. On 25 March 2022, he was named in the Hurricanes U20 team for the 2022 Bunnings Warehouse Super Rugby U20 competition in Taupō.

In 2023, Godfrey was again among the National Development Contracted players, who trained with the Hurricanes. He played in both the Hurricanes' preseason games ahead of the 2023 Super Rugby Pacific season.

International career

In 2020, after an outstanding 1st XV season, Godfrey was invited to attend a Barbarians Under 18 Development Camp, at the end of which he was named in the New Zealand Secondary Schools team. Due to the COVID-19 pandemic, this was only a paper team and it didn't play any games.

A year later, Godfrey was for the first time named in the New Zealand Under 20 team. However, due to the continuing impact of the COVID-19 pandemic, both the 2021 Oceania Rugby Under 20 Championship and World Rugby U20 Championship were cancelled. Instead, the team played a series of four matches on home soil, including one international match against the Cook Islands national team. The NZ Under 20s won that game 73 – 0 and Godfrey scored one of the tries.

In 2022, Godfrey was again named in the New Zealand Under 20 team and played in two of the three matches of the 2022 Oceania Rugby Under 20 Championship. New Zealand won the tournament after winning all three games.

References

External links
NZ Rugby History profile
itsrugby.co.uk profile

2003 births
Living people
People educated at Whanganui Collegiate School
New Zealand rugby union players
Rugby union players from Manawatū-Whanganui
Rugby union fly-halves
Rugby union fullbacks
Hawke's Bay rugby union players
Hurricanes (rugby union) players